Campylorhynchus is a genus of wrens, which has at least 15 described species. At 17–22 cm (6.8-8.7 in) long, these are the largest-bodied of wrens, including the largest species, the giant wren. Member species are found in South and Central America and in some cases, as far north as the southwestern United States.

Taxonomy
A 2007 genetic study established the following relationships between species, including some selected subspecies:

Species

Notes

References

 
Bird genera